The 1930 International cricket season was from April 1930 to August 1930.

Season overview

May

Test Trial in England

June

Australia in England

Ireland in Scotland

July

England in Netherlands

References

1930 in cricket